Burtscheid is a district of the city of Aachen, part of the Aachen-Mitte Stadtbezirk. It is a health resort.

History
It was inhabited since ancient times by Celts and Romans, who were attracted by the presence of hot springs.

Burtscheid Abbey was founded here in 997 by emperor Otto III, with Gregor von Burtscheid as its first abbot. It was finished in 1016–1018.

From 1816 Burtscheid was the administrative capital of the district of Aachen. In 1897 Burtscheid became part of the city of Aachen.

During World War II, the German Nazis established and operated a forced labour camp in the district.

Notable people 
 Egidius Jünger (born 1833), Second Bishop of Seattle
Armin Laschet (born 1961), German politician (CDU)
 Kurt Johnen (1884–1965), German music writer

References

Aachen
Celtic towns
Spa towns in Germany